Alessandro Strozzi (1631–1682) was a Roman Catholic prelate who served as Bishop of Arezzo (1677–1682).

Biography
Alessandro Strozzi was born in Florence, Italy in 1631.
On 8 Mar 1677, he was appointed during the papacy of Pope Innocent XI as Bishop of Arezzo.
On 21 Mar 1677, he was consecrated bishop by Neri Corsini, Bishop Emeritus of Arezzo, with Carlo Vaini, Titular Archbishop of Nicaea, and Prospero Bottini, Titular Archbishop of Myra, serving as co-consecrators. 
He served as Bishop of Arezzo until his death on 19 Oct 1682.

References 

17th-century Italian Roman Catholic bishops
Bishops appointed by Pope Innocent XI
1631 births
1682 deaths